This is a list of National Hockey League (NHL) players who have played at least one game in the NHL from 1917 to present and have a last name that starts with "S".

List updated as of the 2020–21 NHL season.

Sa

 Brandon Saad
 Aleksi Saarela
 Simo Saarinen
 Shaun Sabol
 Bob Sabourin
 Dany Sabourin
 Gary Sabourin
 Ken Sabourin
 Scott Sabourin
 David Sacco
 Joe Sacco
 Larry Sacharuk
 Kirill Safronov
 Rocky Saganiuk
 Joe Sakic
 Alexander Salak
 Ruslan Salei
 Don Saleski
 Anssi Salmela
 Tony Salmelainen
 Borje Salming
 Sami Salo
 Tommy Salo
 Miikka Salomaki
 Andreas Salomonsson
 Barry Salovaara
 Bryce Salvador
 Dave Salvian
 Phil Samis
 Gary Sampson
 Jerome Samson
 Ilya Samsonov
 Sergei Samsonov
 Henrik Samuelsson
 Kjell Samuelsson
 Martin Samuelsson
 Mikael Samuelsson
 Philip Samuelsson
 Ulf Samuelsson
 Scott Sandelin
 Derek Sanderson
 Geoff Sanderson
 Ed Sandford
 Rasmus Sandin
 Jim Sandlak
 Charlie Sands
 Mike Sands
 Tomas Sandstrom
 Terran Sandwith
 Curtis Sanford
 Zach Sanford
 Bobby Sanguinetti
 Travis Sanheim
 Everett Sanipass
 Tommi Santala
 Steven Santini
 Mike Santorelli
 Oleg Saprykin
 Yves Sarault
 Gary Sargent
 Cory Sarich
 Geoff Sarjeant
 Craig Sarner
 Peter Sarno
 Juuse Saros
 Dick Sarrazin
 Fred Sasakamoose
 Grant Sasser
 Miroslav Satan
 Harri Sateri
 Glen Sather
 Kurt Sauer
 Mike Sauer
 Bernie Saunders
 David Saunders
 Teddy Saunders
 Ashton Sautner
 Bob Sauve
 Jean-Francois Sauve
 Maxim Sauve
 Philippe Sauve
 Yann Sauve
 Andre Savage
 Brian Savage
 Gordon "Tony" Savage
 Joel Savage
 Reggie Savage
 Andre Savard
 David Savard
 Denis Savard
 Jean Savard
 Marc Savard
 Serge Savard
 Ryan Savoia
 Raymond Sawada
 Terry Sawchuk
 Kevin Sawyer

Sb–Sc

 Luca Sbisa
 Peter Scamurra
 Marco Scandella
 Dave Scatchard
 Colton Sceviour
 Darin Sceviour
 Joe Schaefer
 Nolan Schaefer
 Paul "Butch" Schaefer
 Peter Schaefer
 Paxton Schafer
 Tim Schaller
 Kevin Schamehorn
 Petr Schastlivy
 John Schella
 Brayden Schenn
 Luke Schenn
 Nikita Scherbak
 Chuck Scherza
 Cameron Schilling
 Ken Schinkel
 Brad Schlegel
 David Schlemko
 Andy Schliebener
 Jordan Schmaltz
 Nick Schmaltz
 Bobby Schmautz
 Cliff Schmautz
 Chris Schmidt
 Clarence Schmidt
 Jack Schmidt
 Joe "Otto" Schmidt
 Milt Schmidt
 Norm Schmidt
 Robert Schnabel
 Werner Schnarr
 Andy Schneider
 Cole Schneider
 Cory Schneider
 Mathieu Schneider
 Danny Schock
 Ron Schock
 Jim Schoenfeld
 Dwight Schofield
 Wally Schreiber
 Rob Schremp
 David "Sweeney" Schriner
 Jordan Schroeder
 Christoph Schubert
 Jimmy Schuldt
 Paxton Schulte
 Dave Schultz
 Jeff Schultz
 Jesse Schultz
 Justin Schultz
 Nick Schultz
 Ray Schultz
 M. F. Schurman
 Rod Schutt
 Corey Schwab
 Jaden Schwartz
 Marek Schwarz
 Scott Scissons
 Enio Sclisizzi
 Ganton Scott
 John Scott
 Laurie Scott
 Richard Scott
 Ron Scott
 Travis Scott
 Darrel Scoville
 Claudio Scremin
 Ben Scrivens
 Howard Scruton
 Rob Scuderi

Se

 Brent Seabrook
 Glen Seabrooke
 Al Secord
 Daniel Sedin
 Henrik Sedin
 Lukas Sedlak
 Ron Sedlbauer
 Nick Seeler
 Steve Seftel
 Brandon Segal
 Danny Seguin
 Steve Seguin
 Tyler Seguin
 Earl Seibert
 Dennis Seidenberg
 Moritz Seider
 Ric Seiling
 Rod Seiling
 Jiri Sejba
 Peter Sejna
 Jiri Sekac
 Andrej Sekera
 Lubomir Sekeras
 Teemu Selanne
 Brit Selby
 Steve Self
 Alexander Selivanov
 Luke Sellars
 Eric Selleck
 Sean Selmser
 Brad Selwood
 Alexander Semak
 Brandy Semchuk
 Dave Semenko
 Alexei Semenov
 Anatoli Semenov
 Alexander Semin
 Brett Seney
 George Senick
 Gilles Senn
 Zachary Senyshyn
 Jyrki Seppa
 Ron Serafini
 Mikhail Sergachev
 Jeff Serowik
 George Servinis
 Tim Sestito
 Tom Sestito
 Devin Setoguchi
 Jaroslav Sevcik
 Cam Severson
 Damon Severson
 Brent Severyn
 Pierre Sevigny
 Richard Sevigny
 Ben Sexton
 Dan Sexton

Sg–Sh

 Michael Sgarbossa
 Eddie Shack
 Joe Shack
 Konstantin Shafronov
 Paul Shakes
 Evgeny Shaldybin
 Brendan Shanahan
 Sean Shanahan
 David Shand
 Daniel Shank
 Charles Shannon
 Darrin Shannon
 Darryl Shannon
 Gerry Shannon
 Ryan Shannon
 Jeff Shantz
 Yegor Sharangovich
 Vadim Sharifijanov
 MacGregor Sharp
 Patrick Sharp
 Jeff Sharples
 Warren "Scott" Sharples
 Glen Sharpley
 Kevin Shattenkirk
 Scott Shaunessy
 Andrew Shaw
 Brad Shaw
 David Shaw
 Logan Shaw
 Normand Shay
 Pat Shea
 Riley Sheahan
 Rob Shearer
 Conor Sheary
 Doug Shedden
 Bobby Sheehan
 Neil Sheehy
 Tim Sheehy
 Jody Shelley
 Doug Shelton
 Frank Sheppard
 Gregg Sheppard
 James Sheppard
 John Sheppard
 Ray Sheppard
 John Sherf
 Fred Shero
 Gordon "Moose" Sherritt
 Kiefer Sherwood
 Kole Sherwood
 Gord Sherven
 Igor Shestyorkin
 Jeff Shevalier
 Jack Shewchuk
 Alex Shibicky
 Allan Shields
 Steve Shields
 Bill Shill
 Jack Shill
 Hunter Shinkaruk
 Brendan Shinnimin
 Rick Shinske
 Vadim Shipachyov
 Jim Shires
 Sergei Shirokov
 Timofei Shishkanov
 Paul Shmyr
 Bruce Shoebottom
 Devin Shore
 Drew Shore
 Eddie Shore
 Hamby Shore
 Nick Shore
 Steve Short
 Mikhail Shtalenkov
 Gary Shuchuk
 Ron Shudra
 Justin Shugg
 Richard Shulmistra
 Steve Shutt
 Denis Shvidki

Si

 Peter Sidorkiewicz
 Albert "Babe" Siebert
 Jonas Siegenthaler
 Patrick Sieloff
 Duncan Siemens
 Jamie Sifers
 Jonathan Sigalet
 Jordan Sigalet
 Mike Siklenka
 Dylan Sikura
 Jakob Silfverberg
 Dave Silk
 Zach Sill
 Mike Sillinger
 Mike Siltala
 Risto Siltanen
 Jonathan Sim
 Trevor Sim
 Martin Simard
 Radim Simek
 Roman Simicek
 Charlie Simmer
 Wayne Simmonds
 Al Simmons
 Don Simmons
 Gary Simmons
 Ben Simon
 Chris Simon
 Dominik Simon
 Jason Simon
 John "Cully" Simon
 Thain Simon
 Todd Simon
 Frank Simonetti
 Bobby Simpson
 Cliff Simpson
 Craig Simpson
 Dillon Simpson
 Harold "Joe" Simpson
 Kent Simpson
 Reid Simpson
 Todd Simpson
 Al Sims
 Shane Sims
 Reggie Sinclair
 Alex Singbush
 Ilkka Sinisalo
 Ville Siren
 Bob Sirois
 Mike Sislo
 Colton Sissons
 Darryl Sittler
 Michal Sivek

Sj–Sl

 Lars-Erik Sjoberg
 Tommy Sjodin
 Fredrik Sjostrom
 Bjorn Skaare
 Jarrod Skalde
 Mackenzie Skapski
 Randy Skarda
 Paul Skidmore
 Jack Skille
 Raymie Skilton
 Alf Skinner
 Brett Skinner
 Jeff Skinner
 Larry Skinner
 Stuart Skinner
 Brady Skjei
 Wade Skolney
 Andrei Skopintsev
 Warren Skorodenski
 Martin Skoula
 Glen Skov
 Karlis Skrastins
 Pavel Skrbek
 Petri Skriko
 Rob Skrlac
 Brian Skrudland
 Peter Skudra
 John Slaney
 Jim Slater
 Jaccob Slavin
 John Sleaver
 Jiri Slegr
 Louis Sleigher
 Anton Slepyshev
 Blake Sloan
 Tod Sloan
 Tyler Sloan
 David Sloane
 Peter Slobodian
 Ed Slowinski
 Darryl Sly
 Matt Smaby
 Doug Smail
 Alex Smart
 Dale Smedsmo
 Richard Smehlik

Sm

 Ladislav Smid
 Don Smillie
 Alexei Smirnov
 Al Smith
 Alex Smith
 Art Smith
 Barry Smith
 Ben Smith
 Billy Smith
 Bobby Smith
 Brad Smith
 Brandon Smith
 Brendan Smith
 Brian Smith (born 1937)
 Brian Smith (born 1940)
 C. J. Smith
 Carl "Winky" Smith
 Clint Smith
 Cole Smith
 Colin Smith
 Craig Smith
 D. J. Smith
 Dallas Smith
 Dalton Smith
 Dalton "Nakina" Smith
 Dan Smith
 Dennis Smith
 Derek Smith (born 1954)
 Derek Smith (born 1984)
 Derrick Smith
 Des Smith
 Don Smith (born 1887)
 Don Smith (born 1929)
 Doug Smith
 Floyd Smith
 Gary Smith
 Gemel Smith
 Geoff Smith
 George Smith
 Givani Smith
 Glen Smith
 Glenn Smith
 Gord Smith
 Greg Smith
 Jason Smith
 Jeremy Smith
 Kenny Smith
 Mark Smith
 Mike Smith
 Nathan Smith
 Nick Smith
 Normie Smith
 Randy Smith
 Reginald "Hooley" Smith
 Reilly Smith
 Rick Smith
 Rodger Smith
 Ron Smith
 Sid Smith
 Stanford Smith
 Steve Smith (born 1963 in Canada)
 Steve Smith (born 1963 in Scotland)
 Stuart Smith (born 1919)
 Stuart Smith (born 1960)
 Tommy Smith
 Trevor Smith
 Ty Smith
 Vern Smith
 Wayne Smith
 Wyatt Smith
 Zack Smith
 Devante Smith-Pelly
 Jerred Smithson
 Radek Smolenak
 Bryan Smolinski
 Jordan Smotherman
 Peter Smrek
 John Smrke
 Stan Smrke
 Stan Smyl
 Rod Smylie
 Brad Smyth
 Greg Smyth
 Kevin Smyth
 Ryan Smyth

Sn-Sr

 Bob Sneddon
 Carl Sneep
 Chris Snell
 Ron Snell
 Ted Snell
 Harold Snepsts
 Garth Snow
 Sandy Snow
 Dave Snuggerud
 Dan Snyder
 Dennis Sobchuk
 Gene Sobchuk
 Vladimir Sobotka
 Carl Soderberg
 Tommy Soderstrom
 Victor Soderstrom
 Doug Soetaert
 Ken Solheim
 Bob Solinger
 Art Somers
 Radovan Somik
 Roy Sommer
 Tom Songin
 Glen Sonmor
 Martin Sonnenberg
 Brent Sopel
 Marcus Sorensen
 Nick Sorensen
 Lee Sorochan
 Ilya Sorokin
 John Sorrell
 Nikita Soshnikov
 Carson Soucy
 Christian Soucy
 Sheldon Souray
 Jaroslav Spacek
 Nick Spaling
 Martin Spanhel
 Garret Sparks
 Emory "Spunk" Sparrow
 Fred Speck
 Bill Speer
 Blake Speers
 Ted Speers
 Gord Spence
 Brian Spencer
 Irv Spencer
 Chris Speyer
 Jason Spezza
 Matthew Spiller
 Red Spooner
 Ryan Spooner
 Corey Spring
 Don Spring
 Frank Spring
 Jesse Spring
 Daniel Sprong
 Ryan Sproul
 Andy Spruce
 Janis Sprukts
 Jared Spurgeon
 Tomas Srsen

St

 Martin St. Amour
 Rick St. Croix
 Frederic St. Denis
 Bruno St. Jacques
 Andre St. Laurent
 Dollard St. Laurent
 Sam St. Laurent
 Martin St. Louis
 Frank St. Marseille
 Martin St. Pierre
 Claude St. Sauveur
 Eric Staal
 Jordan Staal
 Marc Staal
 Ron Stackhouse
 Ted Stackhouse
 Drew Stafford
 Garrett Stafford
 Frank "Butch" Stahan
 Steve Staios
 Matthew Stajan
 Nick Stajduhar
 Viktor Stalberg
 Alan "Red" Staley
 Alex Stalock
 Steven Stamkos
 Lorne Stamler
 Rastislav Stana
 George Standing
 Fred Stanfield
 Jack Stanfield
 Jim Stanfield
 Ed Staniowski
 Ed Stankiewicz
 Myron Stankiewicz
 Allan Stanley
 Barney Stanley
 Daryl Stanley
 Logan Stanley
 Wally Stanowski
 Paul Stanton
 Ryan Stanton 
 Brian Stapleton
 Mike Stapleton
 Pat Stapleton
 Tim Stapleton
 Sergei Starikov
 Joe Starke
 Harold Starr
 Wilfie Starr
 Vic Stasiuk
 Anton Stastny
 Marian Stastny
 Paul Stastny
 Peter Stastny
 Yan Stastny
 Ray Staszak
 Robb Stauber
 Brad Staubitz
 Troy Stecher
 Dave Steckel
 Sam Steel
 Frank Steele
 Alexander Steen
 Anders Steen
 Oskar Steen
 Thomas Steen
 Greg Stefan
 Patrik Stefan
 Morris Stefaniw
 Bud Stefanski
 Phil Stein
 Pete Stemkowski
 Lee Stempniak
 Kevin Stenlund
 Vern Stenlund
 Derek Stepan
 Tobias Stephan
 Charlie Stephens
 Mitchell Stephens
 Bob Stephenson
 Chandler Stephenson
 Shay Stephenson
 Wayne Stephenson
 Brett Sterling
 Ronnie Stern
 Ulf Sterner
 John Stevens
 Kevin Stevens
 Mike Stevens
 Phil Stevens
 Scott Stevens
 Doug Stevenson
 Grant Stevenson
 Jeremy Stevenson
 Shayne Stevenson
 Turner Stevenson
 Alan Stewart
 Anthony Stewart
 Bill Stewart
 Blair Stewart
 Bob Stewart
 Cam Stewart
 Chris Stewart
 Gaye Stewart
 Greg Stewart 
 Jack Stewart
 Jim Stewart
 John Stewart (born 1950)
 John Stewart (born 1954)
 Karl Stewart
 Ken Stewart
 Nels Stewart
 Paul Stewart
 Ralph Stewart
 Ron Stewart
 Ryan Stewart
 Trevor Stienburg
 Tony Stiles
 Cory Stillman
 Riley Stillman
 Ryan Stoa
 P. J. Stock
 Jack Stoddard
 Alek Stojanov
 Anthony Stolarz
 Jarret Stoll
 Karl Stollery
 Roland Stoltz
 Mark Stone
 Michael Stone
 Ryan Stone 
 Steve Stone
 Clayton Stoner
 Jim Storm
 Jamie Storr
 Zack Stortini
 Mike Stothers
 Blaine Stoughton
 Steve Stoyanovich
 Tyson Strachan
 Neil Strain
 Brian Strait
 Martin Straka
 Petr Straka
 Anton Stralman
 Austin Strand
 Gord Strate
 Art Stratton
 Martin Strbak
 Ben Street
 Mark Streit
 Art Strobel
 Dylan Strome
 Ryan Strome
 Ken Strong
 Garret Stroshein
 David Struch
 Jason Strudwick
 Todd Strueby
 Bill "Red" Stuart
 Brad Stuart
 Colin Stuart
 Mark Stuart
 Mike Stuart
 Marian Studenic
 Jack Studnicka
 Jozef Stumpel
 Bob Stumpf
 Peter Sturgeon
 Marco Sturm
 Nico Sturm
 Mike Stutzel
 Tim Stutzle

Su

 Malcolm Subban
 P. K. Subban
 Radoslav Suchy
 C. J. Suess
 Aleksander Suglobov
 Kai Suikkanen
 Libor Sulak
 Doug Sulliman
 Barry Sullivan
 Bob Sullivan
 Brian Sullivan
 Frank Sullivan
 George "Red" Sullivan
 Mike Sullivan
 Peter Sullivan
 Steve Sullivan
 Alexander Sulzer
 Raimo Summanen
 Bill Summerhill
 Chris Summers
 Niklas Sundblad
 Mats Sundin
 Ronnie Sundin
 Oskar Sundqvist
 Johan Sundstrom
 Niklas Sundstrom
 Patrik Sundstrom
 Peter Sundstrom
 Antti Suomela
 Al Suomi
 Damian Surma
 Tomas Surovy
 Maxim Sushinski
 Maxim Sushko
 Andrej Sustr
 Gary Suter
 Pius Suter
 Ryan Suter
 Brian Sutherby
 Bill Sutherland
 Ron "Max" Sutherland
 Brandon Sutter
 Brent Sutter
 Brian Sutter
 Brody Sutter
 Darryl Sutter
 Duane Sutter
 Rich Sutter
 Ron Sutter
 Andy Sutton
 Ken Sutton
 Mark Suzor
 Nick Suzuki

Sv–Sz

 Per Svartvadet
 Marek Svatos
 Andrei Svechnikov
 Evgeny Svechnikov
 Viktor Svedberg
 Robert Svehla
 Jaroslav Svejkovsky
 Leif Svensson
 Magnus Svensson
 Alexandr Svitov
 Jaroslav Svoboda
 Petr Svoboda (born 1966)
 Petr Svoboda (born 1980)
 Garry Swain
 Brian Swanson
 George Swarbrick
 Jeremy Swayman
 Bill Sweatt
 Lee Sweatt
 Bill Sweeney
 Bob Sweeney
 Don Sweeney
 Tim Sweeney
 Darryl Sydor
 Bob Sykes
 Phil Sykes
 Michal Sykora
 Petr Sykora (born 1976)
 Petr Sykora (born 1978)
 Dean Sylvester
 Don Sylvestri
 Danny Syvret
 Paul Szczechura
 Joe Szura
 Jordan Szwarz

See also
 hockeydb.com NHL Player List - T

Players